Empress Sunmyeonghyo or literally known as Sunmyeong, the Filial Piety Empress (Hangul: 순명효황후, Hanja: 純明孝皇后; 20 November 1872 – 5 November 1904), of the Yeoheung Min clan,  was the first wife and Crown Princess Consort of Crown Prince Yi Cheok, who later became the last emperor of the Korean Empire.

Biography
Lady Min was born on 20 November 1872 into the Yeoheung Min clan to Min Tae-ho, leader of the Yeoheung Min clan, and his second wife, Lady Song of the Jincheon Song clan. It was said that her family was poor when she was young until her older brother, Min Yeong-ik, became the adoptive son of Min Seung-ho; who was a relative of the clan.

This was because Min Seung-ho was the adoptive son of Min Chi-rok, the father of Empress Myeongseong. Thus making her adoptive uncle the adoptive older brother of Empress Myeongseong who became Queen in 1866 which helped her family thrive. Because the only son of her father was adopted, he adopted another son from a relative within their clan.

Lady Min also became the adoptive niece to Grand Internal Princess Consort Yeoheung and Grand Internal Prince Heungseon. Making her be adoptive cousins with Min Yeong-hwan, Min Yeong-chan, Prince Heungchin, and Emperor Gojong. Through her 4th great-grandfather, Min Jin-won, she was also a 4th great-grandniece to Queen Inhyeon, and a descendant of Queen Wongyeong. She is also a distant degree cousin of Empress Myeongseong.

She became Crown Princess Consort when she married Crown Prince Yi Cheok on 6 April 1882 at the age of 11. She was known as Crown Princess Consort Min (세자빈 민씨).

With the marriage, it granted her parents royal titles: her father was given the title of “Internal Prince Yeoeun” (여은부원군, 驪恩府院君), and her mother was given the title of “Internal Princess Consort Jinyang of the Jincheon Song clan” (진양부부인 진천 송씨, 鎭陽府夫人 鎭川 宋氏). Her father's other two wives were also given royal titles as well since Lady Min was their step-daughter.

The princess, aged 22, was a witness to her mother-in-law's assassination on 8 October 1895, when she stood in front of the Empress, attempting to protect her. This may have contributed to her early death, as she was plagued by severe depression thereafter.

In 1897, when the Korean Empire became established, her royal title changed to Imperial Crown Princess Consort Min (황태자비 민씨).

Although the Crown Princess and Crown Prince were at the age and stage to have an heir, they did not have children of their own. This was probably due to the Coffee Poisoning Plot that might have gotten her husband infertile from the poison.

She died on 5 November 1904 in Kangtaeil, Gyeongun Palace (now known as Deoksu Palace), before her husband was enthroned. The 13-year-old Yun Jeung-sun was selected and arranged to take her position as crown princess consort in 1907.

She was firstly given the posthumous title of Primary Consort Sunyeol (순열비, 純烈妃), but it was soon changed to Primary Consort Sunmyeong (순명비, 純明妃). Her title was once again changed to her well-known posthumous title, Empress Sunmyeonghyo (순명효황후, 純明孝皇后), when Sunjong became emperor on 19 July 1907.

Empress Sunmyeong was first buried in Nae-dong, Yongmasan, Yangju, Gyeonggi Province where the Neungho at the time was called Yugangwon. She was then moved to Geumgok-dong, Namyangju where the Neungho was changed to Yureung when Sunjong died in 1926. The crown princess is buried with her husband and his second wife, Empress Sunjeong.

Family 
 Great-Great-Great-Great-Great-Great-Great-Great-Great-Grandfather
 Min Hyo-son (민효손, 閔孝孫)
 Great-Great-Great-Great-Great-Great-Great-Great-Great-Grandmother
 Lady Yun of the Papyeong Yun clan (본관: 파평 윤씨); daughter of Yun Ji-kang (윤지강의 딸)
 Great-Great-Great-Great-Great-Great-Great-Great-Grandfather
 Min Yeo-jun (민여준, 閔汝俊) (1539–1599)
 Great-Great-Great-Great-Great-Great-Great-Great-Grandmother
 Lady Yi of the Jeonju Yi clan (전주 이씨, 全州 李氏); descendant of Grand Prince Hyoryeong
 Great-Great-Great-Great-Great-Great-Great-Grandfather
 Min Gi (민기, 閔箕) (1568–18 January 1641)
 Great-Great-Great-Great-Great-Great-Great-Grandmother
 Lady Hong of the Namyang Hong clan (남양 홍씨, 南陽 洪氏); daughter of Hong Ik-hyeon (홍익현, 洪翼賢)
 Great-Great-Great-Great-Great-Great-Grandfather
 Min Gwang-hun (민광훈, 閔光勳) (1595–1659); scholar during the reign of King Injong
 Great-Great-Great-Great-Great-Great-Grandmother
 Lady Yi of the Yeonan Yi clan (이씨, 李氏); (본관: 연안 이씨, 이광정의 딸) daughter of Yi Gwang-jeong (이광정, 李光庭)
 Great-Great-Great-Great-Great-Grandfather
 Min Yu-jung (민유중, 閔維重) (1630 - 29 June 1687); Queen Inhyeon’s father
 Great-Great-Great-Great-Great-Grandmother
 Internal Princess Consort Eunseong of the Eunjin Song clan (은성부부인 은진 송씨, 恩城府夫人 恩津 宋氏); Min Yu-jung's second wife; (본관: 은진 송씨, 송준길의 딸) daughter of Song Jun-gil (송준길, 宋俊吉), Yeonguijeong during the reign of King Hyojong.
 Great-Great-Great-Great-Grandfather
 Min Jin-won (민진원, 閔鎭遠) (1664 - 1736); Queen Inhyeon’s second older brother
 Great-Great-Great-Great-Grandmother
 Lady Yun of the Papyeong Yun clan (윤씨) (본관: 파평윤씨); daughter of Yun Ji-seon (윤지선, 尹趾善) (1627 - 1704)
 Great-Great-Great-Grandfather
 Min Hyeong-su (민형수, 閔亨洙)
 Great-Great-Great-Grandmother
 Lady Yi of the Jeonju Yi clan (본관: 전주 이씨); daughter of Yi Se-hang (이세항)
 Great-Great-Grandfather
 Min Baek-sang (민백상, 閔百祥) (1711 - 1761)
 Adoptive Great-Great-Grandfather - Min Baek-heung (민백흥, 閔百興) (1714 - 1774)
 Great-Great-Grandmother
 Lady Lee of the Ubong Lee clan (본관: 우봉 이씨); daughter of Lee Gu (이구)
 Great-Grandfather
 Min Hong-seob (민홍섭, 閔弘燮)
 Adoptive Great-Grandfather - Min Sang-seob (민상섭, 閔相燮)
 Grandfather
 Min Chi-oh (민치오, 閔致五)
 Grandmother
 Lady Kim of the Gimhae Kim clan (김해 김씨, 金海 金氏)
 Father
 Min Tae-ho (민태호, 閔台鎬) (1834 - 18 October 1884)
 Uncle - Min Gyu-ho (민규호, 閔奎鎬) (20 August 1836 - 15 October 1878)
 Aunt - Lady Song of the Eunjin Song clan (은진 송씨, 恩津 宋氏)
 Cousin - Min Yeong-so (민영소, 閔泳韶) (1852 - 1917)
 Adoptive Aunt - Grand Internal Princess Consort Sunmok (순목대원비, 純穆大院妃) (3 February 1818 - 8 January 1898)
 Adoptive Uncle - Heungseon Daewongun (흥선대원군) (1820 - 1898)
 Adoptive Cousin - Prince Imperial Heungchin (흥친왕) (1845 - 1912)
Adoptive Cousin - Lady Yi of the Jeonju Yi clan (전주 이씨) (? - 1869)
 Adoptive Cousin - King Gojong (고종) (1852 - 1919)
Adoptive Cousin - Lady Yi of the Jeonju Yi clan (전주 이씨) (? - 1899)
 Adoptive Uncle - Min Seung-ho (민승호, 閔升鎬) (1830 - 1874)
 Adoptive Aunt - Lady Kim of the Gwangsan Kim clan (본관: 광산 김씨, 光山 金氏) (? - ? 23 April)
 Unnamed adoptive cousin (? - 1874)
 Adoptive Aunt - Lady Kim of the Yeonan Kim clan (본관: 연안 김씨, 延安 金氏) (? - ? 11 February)
 Adoptive Aunt - Lady Yi of the Deoksu Yi clan (본관: 덕수 이씨, 德水 李氏) (? - ? 1 July)
 Adoptive Uncle - Min Gyeom-ho (민겸호, 閔謙鎬) (1838 - 10 June 1882)
 Adoptive Aunt - Lady Seo (서씨, 徐氏)
 Adoptive Cousin - Min Yeong-hwan (민영환, 閔泳煥) (1861 - 1905)
 Adoptive Cousin - Min Yeong-chan (민영찬, 閔泳瓚) (1873 - 1948)
 Adoptive Aunt - Lady Min of the Yeoheung Min clan (본관: 여흥 민씨, 驪興 閔氏) (1859 - 1942)
 Adoptive Uncle - Jo Eung-seon of the Sinan Ju clan (주용선) (본관: 신안 주씨) (1853 - 1925)
 Adoptive Cousin - Ju Yang-gyu (주양규) (1904 - 1999)
 Mother
 Stepmother - Internal Princess Consort Paseong of the Paepyeong Yun clan (파성부부인 파평 윤씨, 坡城府夫人 坡平 尹氏)
 Biological mother - Internal Princess Consort Jinyang of the Jincheon Song clan (진양부부인 진천 송씨, 鎭陽府夫人  鎭川 宋氏); (본관: 진천 송씨) Min Tae-ho's second wife
 Stepmother - Internal Princess Consort Uichang of the Uiryeong Nam clan (의창부부인 의령 남씨, 宜昌府夫人 宜寧 南氏)
 Siblings
 Older brother - Min Yeong-ik (민영익, 閔泳翊) (1860 - 1914); adoptive son of Min Seung-ho
 Nephew - Min Jeong-sik (민정식, 閔庭植) (1897 - 1952)
 Grandnephew - Min Byeong-jae (민병해, 閔丙海) (1925 - 1945); went missing
 Grandnephew - Min Byeong-ho (민병호, 閔丙湖) (1926 - ?)
 Grandniece - Lady Min of the Yeoheung Min clan (여흥 민씨, 驪興 閔氏)
 Grandnephew-in-law - Hong Gi-hyeon (홍기현, 洪基賢) of the Namyang Hong clan
 Grandniece - Lady Min of the Yeoheung Min clan (여흥 민씨, 驪興 閔氏)
 Grandnephew-in-law - Kim Gwang-il (김광일, 金光日) of the Gwangsan Kim clan
 Grandniece - Lady Min of the Yeoheung Min clan (여흥 민씨, 驪興 閔氏)
 Grandnephew-in-law - Go Seok-jun (고석준, 高錫俊) of the Jeju Go clan
 Adoptive younger brother - Min Yeong-rin (민영린, 閔泳璘) (1873 - 1 June 1932); son of Min Sul-ho (민술호, 閔述鎬)
 Husband
Yi Cheok, Emperor Sunjeong (순종효황제) (25 March 1874 - 25 April 1926) — No issue.
 Mother-in-law - Min Ja-yeong, Empress Myeongseong of the Yeoheung Min clan (명성황후 여흥 민씨) (17 November 1851 – 8 October 1895)
 Father-in-law - Yi Myeong-bok, Emperor Gojong (고종태황제) (9 September 1852 - 21 January 1919)

In popular culture 
 Portrayed by Gwak Jin-yeong in 1990 MBC TV series 500 Years of Joseon: Daewongun
 Portrayed by Park Eun-bin, Kim So-yeong, and Lee Yu-ri in the 2001-2002 KBS2 TV series Empress Myeongseong

References

Korean posthumous empresses
1872 births
1904 deaths
Yeoheung Min clan
People from Seoul